Lewis MacDonald MacLeod (June 1885 – 12 November 1907) was a Scottish rugby union player.

He also played for Cambridge University RFC. He was a centre.

He was the brother of Ken MacLeod who was also capped for Scotland.

He died aged 22.

References
 Bath, Richard (ed.) The Scotland Rugby Miscellany (Vision Sports Publishing Ltd, 2007 )
 

1885 births
1907 deaths
Alumni of the University of Cambridge
Cambridge University R.U.F.C. players
Scotland international rugby union players
Scottish rugby union players
Rugby union centres